Galasa rugosalis is a species of snout moth in the genus Galasa. It was described by Harrison Gray Dyar Jr. in 1913 and is known from French Guiana.

References

Moths described in 1913
Chrysauginae